The term "symplectic" is a calque of "complex" introduced by Hermann Weyl in 1939. In mathematics it may refer to:
 Symplectic Clifford algebra, see Weyl algebra
 Symplectic geometry
 Symplectic group
 Symplectic integrator
 Symplectic manifold
 Symplectic matrix
 Symplectic representation
 Symplectic vector space

It can also refer to:
 Symplectic bone, a bone found in fish skulls
 Symplectite, in reference to a mineral intergrowth texture

See also 
 Metaplectic group
 Symplectomorphism